USS Cactus was a steamer acquired by the Union Navy during the American Civil War for service with the Union blockade of the ports and waterways of the Confederate States of America.

She was used by the Union Navy primarily as a supply ship and as a ship's tender, but she was also equipped with heavy guns to be used as a gunboat if the need occurred.

Service history 

Cactus, an armed side-wheel steamer, was built during 1863 in Brooklyn, New York, as Polar Star; purchased at New York City 9 December 1863; and commissioned 4 May 1864,  Acting Master N. Graham in command.

Assigned to the North Atlantic Blockading Squadron with its task of isolating the Confederacy from overseas sources of supply, Cactus served as a supply ship and tender in Hampton Roads until 28 May 1864. She was then ordered up the York River to guard the Union Army's lines of communication.

After assisting in covering the withdrawal of the Army from White House, Virginia, the steamer returned to Hampton Roads 23 June.

Until April 1865, Cactus operated in Hampton Roads and Chesapeake Bay towing launches and supply schooners.

She then served in the Potomac Flotilla until placed out of commission at the Washington Navy Yard 8 June 1865. Cactus was transferred to the Light House Board 20 June 1865.

References 

Ships of the Union Navy
Ships built in Brooklyn
Gunboats of the United States Navy
Steamships of the United States Navy
Tenders of the United States Navy
American Civil War auxiliary ships of the United States
1863 ships
Stores ships of the United States Navy